Tariq Bin Ziad Colony, Sahiwal is a town in Sahiwal District, Punjab, Pakistan. It is one of the beautiful towns (or colonies) in Sahiwal. The largest and most beautiful park (Faridia Parak) of Sahiwal is also situated there.

References

Populated places in Sahiwal District